Ariulf (died 602) was the second Duke of Spoleto from 592 (the death of Faroald) to his own death.

In 592, Ariulf, whose position at Spoleto and control of key points along the Via Flaminia, the key communication between Ravenna and Rome, to cut its alternative, the fortified  Via Amerina, and capture  several Byzantine cities. He took several strongholds in Latium and threatened Rome, where Gregory the Great, cut off from the Exarchate, was forced to make a separate peace with him, to the intense dissatisfaction of Romanus (exarch), Exarch of Ravenna, who considered himself the Imperial representative in Italy and popes' superior. Ariulf's successes were brief: the Exarch's forces retook the Roman fortifications and the city of Perugia and cleared the roads for the time being.

He then assisted Arechis I of Benevento in besieging Naples, another important city of Imperial Italy. He won a great victory at Camerino, where according to Paul the Deacon, he claimed to have seen Saint Sabinus, the martyr-hero of Spoleto, aiding him and was thus led to convert to Catholic Christianity.

Notes

Sources
Paul the Deacon. (northvegr.org) Historia Langobardorum.

Converts to Roman Catholicism
Dukes of Spoleto
Lombard warriors
6th-century Lombard people
7th-century Lombard people
6th-century rulers in Europe
7th-century rulers in Europe
6th-century births
602 deaths

Year of birth unknown